This is an incomplete list of TU Delft graduates.

A
 Laurens van den Acker, Dutch automobile designer and Vice President of Renault Corporate Design
Mahir Alkaya, Dutch politician

B
 Henk Badings, Dutch composer
 Henri Bal, Dutch computer scientist
 Ad Bax, Dutch biophysicist, contributor to protein nuclear magnetic resonance spectroscopy
 Lourens Baas Becking, Dutch botanist and microbiologist
 Carin ter Beek, Dutch rower, olympic medalist
 Reinout Willem van Bemmelen, Dutch geologist
 Lodewijk van den Berg, Dutch-American astronaut, payload specialist on STS-51B mission
 Maria Elisabeth Bes,  Dutch chemical engineer and the first woman to graduate from TU Delft as an engineer
 Ben van Beurden, CEO of Royal Dutch Shell
 Wiebe Bijker, Dutch sociologists
 Kwasi Boakye, Dutch-Ashanti mining engineer
 Kees Boeke, Dutch Quaker missionary
 Jan Boerman, Dutch composer of electronic music
 Onno J. Boxma, Dutch queuing theorist
 Jo van den Broek, Dutch architect
 Gerrit Broekstra, Dutch systems scientist

C
Luis Chang, Peruvian engineer, transportation minister and ambassador 
Qingyan Chen, Chinese mechanical engineer
Kees Christiaanse, Dutch architect
 Wim Cohen, Dutch mathematician
 Dirk Coster, Dutch physicist, discoverer of hafnium

D
 Jacob Pieter Den Hartog, Dutch mechanical engineer, recipient of the Timoshenko Medal
 Wim Dik, Dutch politicus
 Harry Droog, Dutch rower, Olympic medalist

E
 Erick van Egeraat, Dutch architect
 Gerritjan Eggenkamp, Dutch rower; 2004 Summer Olympics silver medalist
 Willem Alberda van Ekenstein, discoverer of Lobry de Bruyn–van Ekenstein transformation

F
 Adriaan Fokker, Dutch musician and physicist, known for Fokker–Planck equation

G
 Karien van Gennip, Dutch secretary of state for economic affairs
 Willem Frederik Gisolf, Dutch geologist
 Rik Grashoff, Dutch politician

H
 Jaap Haartsen, Dutch engineer, inventor of Bluetooth
 N. John Habraken, Dutch architect, former Dean of MIT Department of Architecture
 Felienne Hermans, Dutch computer scientist
 Herman Hertzberger, Dutch architect
 Jacobus van 't Hoff, Dutch chemist and Nobel laureate
 Geert Hofstede, Dutch organizational sociologist
 Diederik Hol, Dutch engineer, inventor of Dual Box inline skating frame
 Gerard J. Holzmann, Dutch computer scientist, developer of SPIN model checker
 Adrian van Hooydonk, Dutch automobile designer, head of design at BMW
 Alexandre Horowitz, Dutch engineer, designer of Philishave
 Francine Houben, Dutch architect

K
 Thomas Karsten, Dutch architect of Indonesia
 Abdul Qadeer Khan, Pakistani nuclear scientist; metallurgical engineer; known as the "father of the Islamic nuclear bomb"
 Marc Koehler, Dutch architect
 Randal A. Koene, Dutch neuroscientist and neuroengineer, pioneer of whole brain emulation
 Warner T. Koiter, Dutch mechanical engineer
 Diederik Korteweg, Dutch mathematician
 Robert Kozma, Dutch mathematician, University of Memphis professor
 Frederik H. Kreuger, Dutch high voltage scientist and inventor
 Jón Kristinsson, Dutch architect
 Abraham Kuyper, Dutch politician, journalist, statesman and theologian, Prime Minister of the Netherlands

L
 Harm Lagaay, Dutch automobile designer, former chief designer of Porsche
 Richard Lamb, Dutch strategic futurologist
 Cornelis Lely, Dutch engineer, chief designer of Zuiderzee Works
 Walter Lewin, Dutch physicist and MIT professor
 Kazimierz Leski, Polish engineer, designer of ORP Orzeł
 Otto Cornelis Adriaan van Lidth de Jeude, Dutch politician, Minister of War in the Dutch government in exile
 Liem Bwan Tjie, Indonesian architect and proponent of the Amsterdam School
 Wilhelmus Luxemburg, Dutch mathematician and California Institute of Technology professor

M
 Winy Maas, Dutch architect, co-founder of MVRDV
 Han van Meegeren, Dutch painter and portraitist and art forger (studied, did not graduate)
 Simon van der Meer, Dutch engineer and Nobel Prize winner in physics
 Felix Andries Vening Meinesz, Dutch geologist
 Anne Menke, German-born photographer
 Bert Metz, Dutch climatologist, former co-chair of Intergovernmental Panel on Climate Change
 Hubertus van Mook, Dutch administrator in the East Indies (studied, did not graduate)
 Anton Mussert, Dutch politician of the Second World War era and founder of the National Socialist Movement in the Netherlands

N
 Siegfried Nassuth, Dutch architect, author of Bijlmermeer
 Peter Newman, Australian environmental scientist (postdoctoral studies)
 Cornelius Van Niel, Dutch chemist who first demonstrated that photosynthesis is a light-dependent redox reaction

O
 Kas Oosterhuis, Dutch architect
 Prince Friso of Orange-Nassau, member of the Dutch Royal Family
 Alexander van Oudenaarden, Dutch biophysicist, systems biologist and MIT professor

P
 Maja Pantić, Serbian computer scientist
 Frits Peutz, Dutch architect
 Herman Phaff, Dutch scientist who specialized in yeast ecology
 Frits Philips, Dutch engineer, fourth chairman of the board of directors of Philips
 Gerard Philips, Dutch industrialist, co-founder of Philips
 Roel Pieper, Dutch IT entrepreneur
 Willem van der Poel, Dutch engineer and designer of ZEBRA computer

R
 Herman te Riele, Dutch mathematician, known for disproving Mertens conjecture
 Hendrik van Riessen, Dutch reformational philosophers
 Jacob van Rijs, Dutch architect
 Johan Ringers, Dutch politician
 Jo Ritzen, Dutch economist and social-democratic politician
 Clemens C. J. Roothaan, Dutch theoretical physicist and developer of Roothaan equations
 Jan Roskam, Dutch aerospace engineer
 Mien Ruys, Dutch landscape and garden architect

S
 Diederik Samsom, Dutch politician and member of the House of Representatives of the Netherlands for the Dutch Labour Party
 Steef van Schaik, Dutch politician
 Wim Schermerhorn, Dutch engineer, former Prime Minister of The Netherlands
 Pieter Hendrik Schoute, Dutch mathematician
 Jan Arnoldus Schouten, Dutch mathematician and contributor to tensor calculus
 Egbert Schuurman, Dutch reformational philosopher
 Paul van Son, Dutch manager
 Lars Spuybroek, Dutch architect
 Marcel Stive, Dutch coastal engineer
 Alex Verrijn Stuart, Dutch computer scientist
 Eric de Sturler, Dutch mathematician

T
 Bernard Tellegen, Dutch electrical engineer and developer of pentode and gyrator
 Roemer van Toorn, Dutch architect, critic, photographer and professor of architectural theory
 Jan Toorop, Dutch Art Nouveau painter
 Theodoor Philibert Tromp, Dutch politician

V
 Jeroen van der Veer, Dutch engineer, former CEO of Royal Dutch Shell
 Pier Vellinga, Dutch expert on climate change
 Jan Visman, Dutch statistician
 Bas van der Vlies, Dutch politician of the Reformed Political Party
 Hendrik Vos, Dutch politician
 Nathalie de Vries, Dutch architect, co-founder of MVRDV

W
 Leen van der Waal, Dutch engineer and former politician
 Franciscus Cornelis Marie Wijffels, Dutch politician
 Adriaan van Wijngaarden, Dutch computer scientist and developer of Van Wijngaarden grammar and co-designer of ALGOL

Z
 Herman Zanstra, Dutch astronomer, known for Zanstra method
 Piet Zwart, Dutch graphic designer, typographer and industrial designer

References

Delft University of Technology
Delft University of Technology alumni